Western Kentucky Correctional Complex (WKCC) is a segregated, dual-sex, medium-security prison in Lyon County, Kentucky, near the city of Fredonia.  , the facility had 693 prisoners (493 men and 200 women).

History
The facility was built in 1968 to support the Kentucky State Penitentiary (KSP). In 1977, it became its own separate institution, the Western Kentucky Farm Center (WKFC), a minimum-security prison. When WKFC became Western Kentucky Correctional Complex in 1989, medium-security infrastructure was added. The facility was converted from a men's prison to a women's prison in 2010. Ross-Cash was named for two Kentucky Department of Corrections staff members killed in the 1980s, Patricia Ross (died 1984 at KSP) and Fred Cash (died 1986 at WKFC).

Sixty-four percent of prisoners were white while the other thirty-six percent were black.

References

prisons in Kentucky